Brora distillery is a producer of single malt Scotch whisky based in Brora, Scotland. It operated between 1819 and 1983 before being mothballed until 2021, when it was it was reactivated.

History
The Brora distillery was built in 1819 by the Marquess of Stafford, although it was known as "Clynelish" until the opening of the Clynelish Distillery in 1968, whereupon the name of the original Clynelish was changed to "Brora". Between May 1969 and July 1973, Brora produced a heavily peated whisky to supply for blending; this was done to cover a shortage of Islay whisky caused by a drought in that region. Most of the whisky produced as Brora after 1973 is in the lightly peated Highland style.

In early 1983, production at Brora was stopped and the distillery was mothballed.

The release of the 1972 Brora 40 year old in 2014 was the most expensive single malt ever released by Diageo at the time, with a retail price of £7,000.

On 9 October 2017 Diageo announced that it will re-open the Brora distillery with production resuming in 2020. On 19 May 2021 it was announced the reopening was complete and the first new cask of spirit had been filled.

References

External links
Official website

1819 establishments in Scotland
1983 disestablishments in Scotland
Scottish malt whisky
Distilleries in Scotland
Brora
British companies disestablished in 1983
British companies established in 1819
Diageo